Sam McMurray (born April 15, 1952) is an American actor. He is known for his roles as dentist Vic Schweiber on Freaks and Geeks, Supervisor Patrick O'Boyle in the CBS sitcom series The King of Queens, Trent Culpepper in the sitcom Cristela and for voicing Roy in the family sitcom television series Dinosaurs. He also appeared as Doug on the NBC sitcom  Friends, and as Ned on the CBS sitcom Mom.

Early life
McMurray was born in New York City on 15 April 1952, the son of Jane (née Hoffman) and Richard McMurray, both actors. Lesley Woods was his stepmother. McMurray is Jewish on his mother's side of the family and Irish on his father's side of the family. He lives in Bell Canyon, California.

Career
Among McMurray's film credits are Raising Arizona, National Lampoon's Christmas Vacation, Drop Dead Gorgeous, L.A. Story, The Wizard as Jimmy's stepfather Mr. Bateman, and C.H.U.D.  On television, he was a regular on The Tracey Ullman Show, played a recurring role as Chandler's boss on Friends, he also appeared in The King of Queens as Doug and Deacon's boss and also appeared in Disney's Recess, Freaks and Geeks, Home Improvement, The Sopranos, The Tick and Breaking Bad. He is also noted for being the first-ever guest star on The Simpsons.

McMurray gained much international recognition among gamers for his role as the voice of "BBC Newscaster/American Newscaster" in the expansion for Command & Conquer: Generals. He also appeared in the 2011 TV film Holiday Engagement. For the 2014–2015 television season, McMurray had a main role as Trent Culpepper in the ABC comedy series Cristela.

Personal life
McMurray was married to actress Elizabeth Collins. They have two daughters.

Filmography

Film

Television

Television films

Pilots

Specials

Episodic

Video games

Web

As producer

Stage Appearances
The Merry Wives of Windsor, Delacorte Theatre, Joseph Papp PublicTheater/New York Shakespeare Festival, New York City, 1974
(Off-Broadway debut) Lonnie, The Taking of Miss Janie, New York Shakespeare Festival, Mitzi E. Newhouse Theater, 1975
Otis Fitzhugh, Ballymurphy, Manhattan Theatre Club, New York City,1976
Bobby Wheeler, Clarence, Roundabout Theatre, New York City, 1976
Doalty, Translations, Manhattan Theatre Club, 1981
The Great Magoo, Hartford Stage Company, Hartford, CT, 1982
Mick Connor, Comedians, Manhattan Punch Line Theatre, New York City, 1983
Man Overboard, Sargent Theatre, New York City, 1983
Benjamin "Kid Purple" Schwartz, Kid Purple, Manhattan Punch Line Theatre, 1984
Homesteaders, Long Wharf Theatre, New Haven, CT, 1984
Phil, Desperadoes, in Marathon '85, Ensemble Studio Theatre, New York City, 1985
Mike Connor, The Philadelphia Story, Hartman Theatre, Stamford, CT, 1985
Union Boys, Yale Repertory Theatre, New Haven, CT, 1985
L.A. Freewheeling, Hartley House Theatre, New York City, 1986
Savage in Limbo, O'Neill Theatre Center, New London, CT, 1987, then Cast Theatre, Los Angeles
Also appeared as Phil, The Dumping Ground, Ensemble Studio Theatre; and in Welfare, The Store, and Lucky Star, all Ensemble Studio Theatre; A Soldier's Play, New York City; The Connection, New York City.

Awards and nominations

References

External links

1952 births
Living people
20th-century American male actors
21st-century American male actors
American male film actors
American male television actors
American male video game actors
American male voice actors
American people of Jewish descent
American people of Irish descent
Male actors from New York City
People from Bell Canyon, California